Gendelman is a surname. Notable people with the surname include:

Howard E. Gendelman (born 1954), American physician
Ofir Gendelman (born 1971), Israeli diplomat
Zvi Gendelman (born 1956), Israeli politician